was a Japanese academic, historian, author and professor of political science.

Yoshino was active as a political thinker in the Taishō period.  He is best known for his formulation of the theory of "Minponshugi," or politics of the people.

Yoshino was born in Miyagi prefecture in 1878, and entered into Miyagi-Jinjo elementary school (Present Sendai First High school )in 1895. He graduated from Tokyo Imperial University in 1904. In 1906 he went to China as a private tutor for the son of Yuan Shikai, the then dominant Chinese politician. He returned in 1909 and took a position teaching political history and theory in the Faculty of Law at Tokyo Imperial University until 1924. In 1910, he went abroad for three years to study in Germany, England and the United States. On his return he began to write articles discussing the problems of implementing democratic government in Japan, such as political corruption and universal suffrage. He published his most famous essays in the noted literary magazine Chūōkōron. Arguably his most significant work, "On the Meaning of Constitutional Government," was written in response to the popular belief in the superiority of the Prussian pattern. In it, Yoshino argued that democracy was compatible with the concept of the emperor's sovereignty. Yoshino also served as the editor of Taiyō, a well-known literary and general interest magazine.

In December 1918, Yoshino joined with others to establish Reimeikai which was a society "to propagate ideas of democracy among the people."  This group was formed in order to sponsor public lectures.

Notes

References 
 de Bary, William Theodore, Carol Gluck, and Arthur E. Tiedemann (eds.). (2005). Sources of Japanese Tradition (Vol. 2): 1600 to 2000. New York: Columbia University Press.
 Marshall, Byron K. (1992). Academic Freedom and the Japanese Imperial University, 1868-1939. Berkeley: University of California Press.;  OCLC 25130703
 Nussbaum, Louis-Frédéric and Käthe Roth. (2005).  Japan encyclopedia. Cambridge: Harvard University Press. ;  OCLC 58053128

External links 
 e-texts of Sakuzo's works at Aozora bunko

1878 births
1933 deaths
People from Miyagi Prefecture
Japanese writers
Japanese social democrats
University of Tokyo alumni
Academic staff of the University of Tokyo
Japanese political scientists